Botany Bay is a small bay between Church Point and Camp Hill on the south coast of Trinity Peninsula. It was surveyed by the Falkland Islands Dependencies Survey (FIDS) in December 1946, and named for the fossil plants collected there.

References

Landforms of Trinity Peninsula